Gene Stratton Porter Cabin may refer to:

Gene Stratton Porter Cabin (Geneva, Indiana), listed on the National Register of Historic Places in Adams County, Indiana
Gene Stratton-Porter Cabin (Rome City, Indiana), listed on the National Register of Historic Places in Noble County, Indiana

See also
Porter House (disambiguation)